Calliostoma annulatum, also known as the purple-ring topsnail, blue-ring topsnail or jeweled topsnail, is a medium-sized sea snail with gills and an operculum.

This is a sublittoral marine gastropod mollusk in the family Calliostomatidae. This snail lives off of the Pacific coast of North America.

Range of distribution
This top shell can be found in the littoral zone from Isla San Geronimo, Baja California, north to Forrester Island, Alaska.

Shell description
The shell height varies between 16 mm and 35 mm. The elevated-conic shell is imperforate and rather thin. This species is distinguished by its brilliantly colored shell, which is lustrous with a gold field, dotted with brown on the spiral rows of grains, the periphery or lower edge of each whorl encircled by a zone of violet or magenta stripes, the axis surrounded by a tract of the same. The brilliance of the colors fades somewhat once the animal dies. The thin shell shows numerous granulose spiral riblets, about 7 on the penultimate whorl, 9 or 10 on the base. It has few or none interstitial lirulae. The acute, reddish apex is minute. The sutures are slightly impressed. There are about 9 whorls, slightly convex, the last angular at periphery, flattened beneath. The rhomboidal aperture is oblique, fluted within. There is no umbilicus. The head and foot of the animal has a yellow-orange color with brown spots. The color of the shell is gold with purple stripes.

Life habits
This species is fairly omnivorous, feeding seasonally on kelp, sessile fauna like bryozoans, and detritus.

References

 Integrated Taxonomic Information System.  Calliostoma annulatum
 Race Rocks Taxonomy.  Calliostoma annulatum
 Key to Invertebrates Found At or Near Walla Walla College Marine Station.
 Turgeon, D.D., et al. 1998. Common and scientific names of aquatic invertebrates of the United States and Canada. American Fisheries Society Special Publication 26 page(s), p. 61
 Calliostoma annulatum

External links
 

annulatum
Gastropods described in 1786